"Un Ratito" (English: "A Little While") is a song by Puerto Rican rapper Bad Bunny from his fifth studio album Un Verano Sin Ti (2022). The song was written by Benito Martínez and its production was handled by Tainy, La Paciencia and De La Cruz.

Promotion and release
On May 2, 2022, bad Bunny announced his fifth studio album, Un Verano Sin Ti, on which is fifth on the tracklist. On May 6, 2022, "Un Ratito" was released alongside the rest of the album through Rimas Entertainment.

Commercial performance
"Un Ratito" was one of the twenty-two tracks from Un Verano Sin Ti album that charted on the Billboard Hot 100, peaking at number 16. It also performed well on the Billboard Global 200 along with the other twenty-two album tracks, charting at number 11. On the US Hot Latin Songs chart, the track peaked at number 6.

Audio visualizer
A 360° audio visualizer for the song was uploaded to YouTube on May 6, 2022, along with the other audio visualizer videos of the songs that appeared on Un Verano Sin Ti.

Charts

Weekly charts

Year-end charts

Certifications

References

External links
 

2022 songs
Bad Bunny songs
Songs written by Bad Bunny